The 2019–20 Ukrainian Amateur Football Championship season will be the 24th since it replaced the competition of physical culture clubs. 

On 1 July 2018, the AAFU published information about the upcoming season with a tentative composition which should be finalized on 15 July 2019.

Summary
Due to the COVID-19 pandemic, the spring half was suspended to summer. On 7 June 2020, there took place the AAFU conference which among other issues also discussed reorganization of the organization. A couple months before that on 31 March 2020 in car accident died the president of AAFU Fedir Shpyh.

On 17 June 2020, there appeared information that it is the final day for clubs to confirm their participation in continuation of the AAFU competitions, which could be resumed on 27 June 2020.

On 22 June 2020, there appeared information about that the season will be resumed on 27 June 2020 and finished with some changes to the regulations. Due to extensive pause in the competition, at least 10 teams withdrew.

Teams

Relegated professional clubs 
 Zirka Kropyvnytskyi – 15th place (withdrew) in the 2018–19 Ukrainian First League (returning, last played season in 2007)

Returning/reformed clubs 
 Nyva Terebovlia (returning, last played season in 2017–18)
 FC Chernihiv (returning, last played season in 2017–18)
 Dnipro Cherkasy (returning, last played season in 2003 as FC Cherkasy)
 Epitsentr Dunayivtsi (returning, last played season in 2010 as Verest Dunayivtsi)
 Kovel-Volyn Kovel (returning, last played season in 2016–17)

Debut  
List of teams that are debuting this season in the league.

Atlet Kyiv, Bila Tserkva, Dnipro-1-Borysfen Dnipro, Lehioner Dnipro, LutskSanTekhMontazh (LSTM) No.536, Svitanok-Ahrosvit Shlyakhova, FC Trostianets, Votrans Lutsk, FC Vovchansk, Kremin-Yuniors Kremenchuk.

Withdrawn teams
List of clubs that took part in last year competition, but chose not to participate in 2019–20 season:

 Krystal Chortkiv
 FC Ternopil
 SC Khmelnytskyi

 Chaika Vyshhorod
 Fakel Lypovets
 Avanhard Bziv

 FC Dnipro 
 Skoruk Tomakivka
 Druzhba Kryvyi Rih
 FC Kryvyi Rih

Clubs that did not play last season in the league, but showed interest at first yet withdrew before the start of the season:

 Praid Tokmak (debut)
 Ahronyva Zavodske (debut)

 Tavria-Skif Rozdol (played in 2017–18)

List of clubs that withdrew during the season:
 FC Malynsk

Merged teams / Name change
 On 2 March 2020 during midseason winter recession, it became known that FC Chernihiv is merging with FC Avanhard Koryukivka in order to participate next season in the Second League. The united team would be finishing the second half of the 2019–20 season in amateurs. The AAFU allowed the merged club to keep its second team without purging it.
 On 1 March 2020 FC Trostianets-2 change its name to FC Trostianets.
 On 19 June 2020 FC Rubikon-Vyshneve Kyiv change its name to FC Rubikon Kyiv.
 On 19 June 2020 FC Chernihiv change its name to FC Chernihiv-YuSB.
 On 19 June 2020 FC Avanhard Koriukivka change its name to FC Chernihiv-Avanhard Koriukivka.

Location map 
The following displays the location of teams.

Stadiums
Group A
Group B
Group C

Notes:
 Reg — regional championship (Regions of Ukraine)
 Am[#] — AAFU championship where sign (#) indicates Group number
 1L — PFL First League championship

Group stage

Group 1

Notes

Group 2

Notes

Group 3

Notes
 On 8 August 2019 the Ukrainian Association of Football announced that Peremoha was stripped of 9 tournament points in the 2019–20 season. However, the AAFU official standing did not reflect that fact and no mentioning about the decision either.
 The game between Dnipro-1-Borysfen and Motor on 28 September 2019 did not take place, possible due to fact that a team of medics did not arrive to the game. Later the standings were adjusted where it was reflected that Motor received technical victory (3:0) and Dnipro technical loss (0:3).
 During the weekend October 5–6, 2019 two more scheduled games failed to take place Vovchansk – Peremoha (5 October) and Motor – Zirka (6 October). Both games were granted on 7 October 2019 technical scores by AAFU with wins awarded to hosting teams in both games.
 Please, note that sum of wins in the table is lower than sum of losses because in games between withdrawn clubs that did not take place both received loss.

Second stage
Following ease of quarantine restrictions, on 22 June 2020 it was announced that the competition will be resumed on 27 June 2020. It was decided to finish the first stage of competition consisting of three groups as planned, however for the second stage it was decided to replace play-off format with another group stage final mini-tournament consisting of two groups of 4 each and taking place in one place. The second stage is expected to take place in early August and will also include the final game. On 28 July 2020 the AAFU approved the format for the final (second) stage which would be as a single-elimination tournament with a single leg. The first games are expected to take place on 9 August 2020 with the draw for semifinals taking place the next day on 10 August. The final game will take place at the Viktor Bannikov Educational and Training Field in Kyiv.

On 6 August 2020 it was announced that the new season is expected to start on 29 August 2020, while registration to participate in competitions on 10 August 2020. The Ukrainian Amateur Cup is being planned to start on September 9-16, 2020.

Quarterfinals

|}

 Notes: Vovchansk received home turf advantage earning 42 points in 18 games, while Epitsentr 39 points in 18 games (see the group stage standings above and the 2019–20 AAFU playoffs format).

Semifinals
The semifinal pairs will be drawn on 10 August 2020, participants of which are planned to meet on 13 August 2020.

|}

Finals
The final is planned to take place on 16 August 2020.

|}

Promotions to the Second League
In a preliminary list, there were 10 contenders for promotion to the Professional Football League competitions (announced on 12 November 2019): Zirka Kropyvnytskyi, Yarud Mariupol, Peremoha Dnipro, Trostianets-2, Dnipro Cherkasy, Rubikon Vyshneve, ODEK Orzhiv, Epitsentr Dunayivtsi, Munkach Mukacheve, Kovel-Volyn.

As of 24 December 2019, ten clubs have sent the applications for Second League license: FC Zirka Kropyvnytskyi, FC Yarud Mariupol, FC Peremoha Dnipro, FC Academiya Sportu Trostianets, MSC Dnipro Cherkasy, FC Vyshneve, FC Vovchansk, FC Avanhard Koryukivka, FC Karpaty Burshtyn, FC Bila Tserkva.

On 5 August 2020, there became publicized a list of ten main contenders to be promoted to the Second League, Dnipro Cherkasy, Yarud Mariupol, Chernihiv-Avanhard, FC Trostianets, FC Bila Tserkva, Peremoha Dnipro, Epitsentr Dunayivtsi, Rubikon Kyiv, Karpaty Halych, Metall Kharkiv.

See also
 2019–20 Ukrainian Amateur Cup
 2019–20 Ukrainian Second League
 2019–20 Ukrainian First League
 2019–20 Ukrainian Premier League

Notes

References

External links
AAFU
The 2018–19 season's regulations. AAFU.
Valeriy Kholodnyi. The consolidated table of oriented dates for start of oblast championships (Зведена таблиця орієнтовних дат початку обласних чемпіонатів). Footboom. 29 May 2020.
Video of the final. Viktoriya Mykolaivka YouTube channel.
Artur Valerko. Only one will receive: today is the AAFU championship super final (Достанется только одному: сегодня супер-финал Чемпионата ААФУ). Sport Arena. 16 August 2020

Ukrainian Football Amateur League seasons
Amateur
Ukraine
Ukrainian